David Glen Eisley (born September 5, 1952) is an American musician, singer, songwriter, and actor.

Personal life
Eisley was born in Los Angeles, California and is the son of actor Anthony Eisley and Judith Tubbs Eisley. While in high school, he played drums for the band Mammoth, an Iron Butterfly cover band. Before settling into music, Eisley spent much of his early days playing baseball. He eventually reached Double-A for the San Francisco Giants, commuting back and forth between games and club gigs.

He is married to actress Olivia Hussey with whom he has one daughter, India Eisley. He is the older brother of actor and stuntman Jonathan Erickson Eisley.

Music career
He is most well known for being the lead singer for the AOR bands Sorcery (1980–1983), Giuffria (1983–1988), Dirty White Boy (1988–1991), with Craig Goldy's "Ritual" he released Hidden In Plain Sight (1991) and Stream (1998). His biggest success came with the band Giuffria, when their hit single "Call to the Heart" reached number 15 on the Billboard Hot 100 in early 1985. Eisley has also appeared in the television shows Beverly Hills, 90210 and 7th Heaven, the movie Action Jackson and has acted in various commercials. 

In 1997, Eisley co-wrote the rock ballad "Sweet Victory" with Bob Kulick under the label of Arista Records, and in the following year, APM Music released the track on their Bruton Music Library album American Games. They had previously worked together in the short-lived band Murderer's Row, releasing a self-titled album in 1996. The song was featured in the 2001 SpongeBob SquarePants episode "Band Geeks" which sharply increased its popularity, with it reaching number 23 on the Hot Rock Songs chart in February 2019 after Super Bowl LIII.

Later years
He has released four solo albums, War Dogs in 1999, Stranger from the Past in 2000, a compilation album of previously unreleased songs, The Lost Tapes, in 2003, and Tattered Torn & Worn... in 2019.

In 2017, Eisley was featured as lead vocalist on three songs on Bob Kulick's album Skeletons in the Closet.  On December 1, 2017 he released an album with Craig Goldy, under the band name Eisley/Goldy, titled Blood, Guts and Games.

References

External links

1952 births
Living people
American male film actors
American male television actors
American heavy metal singers
Giuffria members
Arista Records artists
DFTBA Records creators
Universal Music Group artists
People from Los Angeles